Sam Mbakwe International Cargo Airport , also known as Imo State Airport, serves Owerri, the capital city of Imo State in southeastern Nigeria. It is located in Ngor Okpala Local Government Area, Imo State. 

The building of the airport commenced with the administration of the first civilian governor of the old Imo State (now, Imo, Abia and Southern Ebonyi states), Dee Sam Mbakwe, in 1983  from generous contributions of the indigenes and people of the state and throughout the Igbo land. It is to be noted that while this is the first state owned airport, it is worthy to acknowledge also that it is the first community driven airport project ever known, at least, in the West of Africa. The project also enjoyed an immense support from then successive Federal Military Governments especially under Navy Captain James N. Aneke, who saw to its completion, commissioning and operational commencement in 15th July, 1994 under late General Sani Abacha.

Other cities served by the airport are, the commercial city of Onitsha, automobile and manufacturing city of Nnewi in Anambra State, the industrial hub of Aba, Umuahia and Arochukwu in Abia State. Others are Okigwe, Oguta, and Orlu business districts in Imo State. The airport also serves some parts of Akwa Ibom and Cross River States in the South South part of Nigeria.

The airport is named after Sam Mbakwe, the first civilian governor of Imo State who started the project. As mentioned, it is the first state-government-built airport built from the support and contributions of indigenes of the state and entire Igbo land. Navy Captain James N Aneke who was the military administrator of Imo State from 9th December, 1993 to 22nd August,1996 during the military regime of General completed and commissioned the airport in 15th July, 1994. It was later handed over to FAAN (Federal Airport Authority of Nigeria) to be managed by the federal government.

Facilities

The airport underwent upgrading in 2013-14 that covered its infrastructure and the communication equipment covering the airspace past Port Harcourt Airport as part of the Total Radar Coverage of Nigeria (TRACON) project.

The airport has night landing capabilities, but for most flights in non-international designated airports, the Federal Airports Authority of Nigeria restricts night operations except for passenger flights during pilgrimage (Hajj).

Airlines and destinations

Statistics 
These data show number of passengers movements into the airport, according to the Federal Airports Authority of Nigeria's Aviation Sector Summary Reports.

See also
Transport in Nigeria
List of airports in Nigeria
List of the busiest airports in Africa

References

External links
OurAirports - Owerri
SkyVector - Owerri

Airports in Nigeria
Imo State